Fevzi Şeker (27 July 1962 – 15 December 2011) was a Turkish wrestler who competed in the 1984 Summer Olympics and in the 1988 Summer Olympics.

Career 
He started wrestling in 1974. Born in Sivas in 1962, Fevzi Şeker started wrestling at Istanbul Fatih Wrestling Club in 1974, and continued wrestling at Istanbul Tekel Sports Club, Tofaş SAS Sports Club, Simtel Sports Club, İskenderun Demirçelik Sports Club. His coaches were Servet Meric, Nasuh Akar, Muharrem Atik. In 1981, Fevzi Şeker ranked third in the world in the 68 kg junior freestyle category in Vancouver, Canada, and in 1983 he won the gold medal in the 68 kg freestyle category at the Mediterranean Games in Casablanca, Morocco. In the same year, Fevzi Şeker ranked second in Europe in Budapest in the same weight category, and in the 1984 Los Angeles Olympics, he came 6th in the freestyle 68 kg category.

Fevzi Şeker came second in Europe in 1985, first in the Mediterranean Games in 1987 and third in Europe in 1987 and 1989. In 1990, Fevzi Şeker won the gold medal at the 1990 European Wrestling Championships in Poznan, Poland, and worked as a coach after quitting wrestling.

On December 15, 2011, Şeker, who was in camp with the national team at the wrestling camp training center in Elmadağ as part of the preparations for the European Championship, played a football match with the national team athletes and coaches after the evening training. Fevzi Şeker collapsed during the match and was first treated at Elmadağ Hospital. Şeker was then taken by ambulance to Yüksek İhtisas Hospital, where he could not be saved despite all interventions and passed away at the age of 49. His grave is in Karşıyaka Cemetery.

References

External links
 

1962 births
2011 deaths
Olympic wrestlers of Turkey
Wrestlers at the 1984 Summer Olympics
Wrestlers at the 1988 Summer Olympics
Turkish male sport wrestlers
European Wrestling Champions
Competitors at the 1983 Mediterranean Games
Competitors at the 1987 Mediterranean Games
Mediterranean Games medalists in wrestling
Mediterranean Games gold medalists for Turkey